Don Winslow of the Navy is a 1942 Universal Pictures Serial film based on the comic strip Don Winslow of the Navy by Commander Frank V. Martinek. It was theatrically released in January 1942.

Plot
Commander Don Winslow is returned to the Office of Naval Intelligence from his command of his cruiser to investigate strange events on the Pacific island of Tangita, noticeably a ship being torpedoed. He discovers that there is a ring of saboteurs and enemy agents who are trying to destroy ships carrying supplies to the troops stationed in the islands and sabotage the war effort. Though the US Navy is preparing to build a naval base on Tangita, an unknown foreign power secretly has a subterranean submarine base beneath the island with the goal of preventing the American base from being completed. He sets out with three assistants to find the mastermind behind the activities.

Cast

Production
The serial was based on the comic strip by Commander Frank V. Martinek, which was approved by the US Navy. The strip gained new meaning with the approach of World War II, which would also affect the serial: "Its presentation as a Universal serial in October 1941 - just before the infamous attack on Pearl Harbor in December - was one of the most timely contributions of the serial field."

The Universal serials for 1941-42 were meant to run: Riders of Death Valley, Sea Raiders, Head Hunters of the Amazon, Gang Busters. Head Hunters of the Amazon was, however, dropped in favor of this serial. This is possibly due to the greater name recognition of the licensed property over the more generic planned serial.

Chapter titles
 The Human Torpedo
 Flaming Death
 Weapons of Horror
 Towering Doom
 Trapped in the Dungeon
 Menaced by Man-Eaters
 Bombed by the Enemy
 The Chamber of Doom
 Wings of Destruction
 Fighting Fathoms Deep
 Caught in the Caverns
 The Scorpion Strangled
Source:

Sequel 
In 1943, a sequel, Don Winslow of the Coast Guard, was released by Universal.

See also
Don Winslow of the Navy (comic strip)
Don Winslow of the Navy (radio program)

References

External links
 
 
 Chapter 1 of Don Winslow of the Navy from Internet Archive. (Page includes links to other chapters.)

1942 films
American spy films
American black-and-white films
1940s English-language films
Universal Pictures film serials
Films based on comic strips
Films based on American comics
Films directed by Ray Taylor
Films about the United States Navy in World War II
World War II films made in wartime
1940s spy films